René Aufhauser (born 21 June 1976) is an Austrian football coach and a former player.

Career 
In the early part of his career he had stints at ASK Köflach, ASK Voitsberg and Red Bull Salzburg. It was at ASK Voitsberg was where his talent was discovered whilst playing defensive midfield.

SV Austria Salzburg (1997–2001) 
He signed for SV Austria Salzburg in 1997 after spending a highly successful six months there in the previous season. Soon the former amateur player was getting called up by the Austria U-21 team. The young midfielder kept a place in the team despite there bing a host of big names in the squad. He left in 2001 because the coach was letting him develop. The club he chose was Grazer AK.

Grazer AK (2001–2005) 
At the start of his Grazer AK career he didn't play every game because he had to fight with Slovenian captain Aleš Čeh. His performances for Grazer AK attracted interest from clubs like Everton F.C., Fulham F.C. and Middlesbrough F.C.  He left Grazer AK in 2005 for former club Red Bull Salzburg

Red Bull Salzburg (2005–2010) 
His return to his former club has brought more success to his club and international level. During his second spell at Salzburg, this time the club under the ownership of Red Bull, he made 115 league appearances, netting 20 times in the process. Aufhauser also won the Austrian championship twice. In January 2010, he was sent to the reserve team and given the opportunity to leave the club, having only made two league starts that season under new coach Huub Stevens.

LASK Linz (2010–2012)
Aufhauser completed a move to Bundesliga side LASK Linz at the end of the January 2010 transfer window. His first goal for the club was a winner away to FK Austria Wien during a 1–0 win in March 2010. After the denieing of a licence and the relegation to the 3rd league Aufhauser left the club

FC Liefering (2012–2014)
Aufhauser signed for FC Liefering, the farm team of FC Red Bull Salzburg. It was intended that he should be the leading figure in this young team. Liefering became champion of the Regionalliga West and in two matches (2:0; 3:0) against Aufhausers former team LASK they were able to reach the First league, the second level in Austrian football.

After two seasons with Liefering his career ended. After that, he became assistant coach at the club.

International career 
Despite his good performances he was unconsidered by former national team head coach Herbert Prohaska. Only under Otto Barić he was called up in 2001 as a Grazer AK player against Liechtenstein however he only made it on the bench. He finally made his début under Otto Barić's successor, Hans Krankl against Slovakia on 27 March 2002. Under Hans Krankl he was given a place in the starting 11 as well as under new coach Josef Hickersberger. So far he has participated in 50 international matches, scoring 10 goals.

In the opening game for Austria at UEFA Euro 2008 in Vienna, he fouled Croatian forward Ivica Olić, which led to a penalty for Croatia. Luka Modrić converted the penalty kick into a 1–0 lead in the fourth minute of the game.

National team statistics

Managerial statistics

Honours
Austrian Football Bundesliga (3):
 2004, 2007, 2009
Austrian Cup (2):
 2002, 2004

References

External links 
 

1976 births
Living people
Austrian footballers
Austria international footballers
UEFA Euro 2008 players
FC Red Bull Salzburg players
Grazer AK players
LASK players
FC Liefering players
Austrian Football Bundesliga players
Association football midfielders
Austrian football managers
FC Liefering managers
People from Voitsberg
Footballers from Styria